René Forgeot (9 December 1905 in Brest – 9 June 1995 in Saint-Romain-de-Lerps) known in literature under the pseudonym Noël Devaulx, was a French novelist and short-story writer.

Life 
After having had to give up his maritime career for health reasons, and supported by Boris de Schloezer, René Forgeot graduated from the École Supérieure d'Électricité. In full German occupation of France, the author said that Le pressoir mystique could not be put into all hands: in fact, the collaborationist Pierre Drieu La Rochelle expressed some reservations. The whole situation set Noël Devaulx among the rank of the greatest. His first collection of short stories, L'Auberge Papillon was published by Éditions Gallimard in 1945. In 1948, Albert Béguin finally published in Neuchâtel, in his collection of "Cahiers du Rhône", Le pressoir mystique. From that moment, the narrator appeared both as a classical by style, by mastery and stripping of style, and as a fantastic, by his taste for the fabulous atmosphere and the perpetual presence of metaphysical or dreamlike suggestions: characters endowed with a "more than human nature" like La Dame de Murcie, whose eyes possess an enigmatic and irrefutable power.

Jean Paulhan, in his 1945 "Post-face", writes that it is "already very laudable to write parables": he wants to see in Noël Devaulx one of the storytellers capable of drawing the reader out of the "small world where we are enclosed, between German metaphysics and the American novel (who get along very well, who have concluded a sort of pact, no one knows why!). "Is this the double reason for his relegation?" "Theater d'ombres" According to the expression of H. Ronse (NRF, 2, 1967) but where the evident existence of these shadows is like hollow engraving of nostalgia for the spiritual and the sacred.

Works 
 1945: L'Auberge Parpillon, short stories, post-face by Jean Paulhan, Éditions Gallimard
 1948: Le Pressoir mystique, short stories, Neuchâtel, Éditions La Baconnière - Paris, Éditions du Seuil
 1949: Compère, vous mentez!..., narrative, Gallimard, series "Métamorphoses"
 1952: Sainte Barbegrise, narrative, Gallimard
 1955: Bal chez Alféoni, tales, Gallimard
 1961: La Dame de Murcie, Gallimard
 1966: Frontières, Gallimard
 1974: Avec vue sur la zone, Éditions José Corti (Prix des Critiques)
 1977: Le Lézard d'immortalité, Éditions Gallimard (prix de la Nouvelle de l'Académie française)
 1979: La Plume et la racine, short stories, Gallimard
 1981: Le Manuscrit inachevé, Gallimard, Prix Valery Larbaud
 1983: Le Vase de Gurgan, short stories, Gallimard
 1985: Le Visiteur insolite, short stories, Gallimard
 1986: Instruction civique, Gallimard
 1989: Capricieuse Diane, short stories, Gallimard 
 1993: Mémoires du perroquet Papageno, Éditions Dumerchez 
 1994: Visite au palais pompéien, Gallimard

Critical bibliography 
1964: Évelyne Margerie, Les lieux du merveilleux et du fantastique dans l'œuvre de Noël Devaulx. thesis.

References

External links 
 Noël Devaulx on Babelio
 Noël Delvaux on the site of the Académie française
 Noël Devaulx on the site of the Encylodédia universalis
 Edward Gauvin, Noël Devaulx, The Secret Master, Noël Devaulx, The Secret Master weirdfictionreview.com
 Noël Devaulx poète de l'étrange on INA.fr (video 1 August 1977)

Writers from Brest, France
1905 births
1995 deaths
20th-century French non-fiction writers
Prix Valery Larbaud winners